Irundisaua lewisi is a species of beetle in the family Cerambycidae. It was described by Audureau in 2009.

References

Acanthoderini
Beetles described in 2009